Simmons Field is a baseball stadium in Kenosha, Wisconsin. It was the home field of the Kenosha Comets of the All-American Girls Professional Baseball League (AAGPBL).

History

Simmons Field opened in Kenosha in 1920 as a field for the Simmons Bedding Company's baseball team. The stadium's original capacity was 7,000. The park allowed for growth of the company's Simmons Bedmakers team and provided a suitable venue city's flourishing baseball rivalries.

The concrete grandstand was re-built in 1930. By that time, however, the city's baseball teams had begun to decline despite a Midwest League championship for the Bedmakers in 1924.

In 1947, the Simmons Company sold the field and the city made it available the following year for use by the city's women's professional baseball team, the Kenosha Comets. The Comets, of the All-American Girls Professional Baseball League (AAGPBL), had played in Kenosha at Lakefront Stadium since the league was founded in 1943. The team played at Simmons Field from 1948 until its final season in 1951. The AAGPBL folded three seasons later.

Throughout the ensuing decades, Simmons Field was used by little leagues, amateur leagues and for exhibition games. Warren Spahn, Bob Feller and Satchel Paige pitched there. The Kenosha Pirates, a local semi-pro team, also played at Simmons Field during this era. But the stadium fell into disrepair without a major tenant.

Then in 1984, Kenosha native and former minor league pitcher Bob Lee transformed the old venue when he purchased the Minnesota Twins Single-A Midwest League affiliate and moved the team into Simmons Field. The move provided for approximately $350,000 worth of improvements to the field, including a new clubhouse, new in-ground dugouts, a new wood outfield fence, a new electronic scoreboard, concession facilities and aluminum bleachers along the third base line.

The Kenosha Twins played at Simmons Field for nine years, winning two Midwest League championships and producing more than a dozen major league players, including four players on the Minnesota Twins 1991 World Championship team. That World Championship team included American League Rookie of the Year Chuck Knoblauch and long-time Kenosha resident and former University of Wisconsin–Parkside head baseball coach Jarvis Brown, who played for the Kenosha Twins in 1987 and 1988. Current Carthage College head baseball coach Augie Schmidt also played at Simmons for the Twins in 1986, before retiring from professional baseball.

In July 1991, Chicago Cubs legend Rick Sutcliffe pitched nine innings in an injury rehab start for the Peoria Chiefs against the Twins at Simmons Field. A crowd of 4,387 attended that game, producing the largest crowd of the Bob Lee-era at Simmons. However, a decline in overall attendance and higher standards for minor league baseball facilities forced Lee to sell the team after the 1991 season. New ownership moved the team to Fort Wayne, Indiana after the 1992 season.

The Kenosha Kings, a local semi-pro team, also took up residence at Simmons Field in 1984. The Kings currently compete in the Wisconsin State League and won the league's championship in 2006. The Kings are in their 25th consecutive season at the stadium, the longest run of any team during the history of the ballpark.

During the 1990s, Simmons Field was home to amateur teams of high school and college talents, as well as the Kings. The locally-run Kenosha Chiefs semi-pro team also was the stadium's primary tenant in 1993, and the Kenosha Kroakers of the collegiate summer Northwoods League called Simmons home from 1994 to 1999.

In June 1998, Green Bay Packers players also appeared at Simmons Field for a charity softball game that also drew thousands of fans. And in August 1999, chart-topping pop group 'N Sync also played a charity softball game at Simmons in front of roughly 2,800 fans.

In 2000, AAGPBL players returned to Simmons Field for a reunion and dozens of the former players dedicated a plaque to commemorate the AAGPBL's time in Kenosha.

Simmons Field was home to professional baseball once more in 2003 when the Dubois County Dragons of the independent Frontier League moved and became the Kenosha Mammoths. However, the Mammoths failed to attract large crowds and the team moved again after one season in Kenosha.

In 2007 the Kenosha Parks Department leased Simmons Field to the Kenosha Unified School District (KUSD). KUSD has since leased the field to the Kenosha Simmons Baseball Organization (KSBO), a non-profit group working to upgrade and restore the stadium. Initial improvements included a rebuilt infield, which was completed in the fall of 2007, and a new electronic scoreboard behind left field.

In July 2008 the Men's Senior Baseball League (MSBL) of Kenosha organized the 2008 Women's Hall of Fame Classic. This event hosted a large contingency of the AAGPBL players in a rededication of Simmons Field to women's baseball. The event provided the best female baseball players in the country the opportunity to tryout for positions on the US team competing in the 2008 World Cup Games in Japan. The event was capped off with a five team international women's baseball tournament featuring the Aussie Hearts, Chicago Pioneers, Nashua Pride, New England Red Sox and Washington Stars. The tournament was won by the Aussie Hearts coached by Kenosha native Rob Novotny.

Current use

Simmons Field is the home of the Kenosha Kingfish, who played their first season in the summer of 2014. The Kenosha Kingfish are one of 18 teams in the Northwoods League, a minor-league style collegiate, summer league of college baseball players from across the nation. The Kingfish administration renovated Historic Simmons Field in 2013. The newly renovated stadium has over 2,100 seats, obtained from Camden Yards, contains two Home Plate Suites, a party deck, and a general admission lawn seating area.

Starting with the 2019 season, the University of Wisconsin-Parkside baseball team moved their home games from Oberbrunner Field on the UW-Parkside campus to Simmons Field.

Baseball venues in Wisconsin
Minor league baseball venues
Sports in Kenosha, Wisconsin
1920 establishments in Wisconsin
Sports venues completed in 1920
High school baseball venues in the United States
Defunct Midwest League ballparks